
Airfight is an early 3D graphics-based multi-user flight simulator, created on the University of Illinois Urbana-Champaign (UIUC)  Control Data Corporation (CDC) PLATO system in the early 1970s.

The software was the first ever 3D flight simulator and the first multi-player flight simulator. The first version was developed by Brand Fortner with Kevin Gorey in the summer of 1974. After its release, it became the most popular game on PLATO until Empire became more popular. This software probably inspired the UIUC student Bruce Artwick to start the company Sublogic, which was acquired and later became Microsoft Flight Simulator.

See also
 SGI Dogfight (1985), a Silicon Graphics multi-user flight simulator

References

Further reading

External links
 
 

1974 video games
3D graphics software
Multiplayer online games
Combat flight simulators
PLATO (computer system) games
Video games developed in the United States